The County of Delatite is one of the 37 counties of Victoria which are part of the cadastral divisions of Australia, used for land titles. It is located south west of Ovens River. Wangaratta is partly located in the county, at the northern end.

Parishes 
Parishes within the county:
 Barwite, Victoria
 Beolite, Victoria
 Boho, Victoria
 Borodomanin, Victoria
 Brankeet, Victoria
 Buckland, Victoria
 Bungamero, Victoria
 Cambatong, Victoria
 Carboor, Victoria
 Coolumbooka, Victoria
 Coolungubra, Victoria
 Delatite, Victoria
 Dondangadale, Victoria
 Doolam, Victoria
 Dueran, Victoria
 Dueran East, Victoria
 Edi, Victoria
 Eurandelong, Victoria
 Garratanbunell, Victoria
 Gonzaga, Victoria
 Gooramgooramgong, Victoria
 Greta, Victoria
 Kelfeera, Victoria
 Koonika, Victoria
 Laceby, Victoria
 Lima, Victoria
 Loyola, Victoria
 Lurg, Victoria
 Maharatta, Victoria
 Maindample, Victoria
 Mansfield, Victoria
 Marraweeny, Victoria
 Matong, Victoria
 Matong North, Victoria
 Merrijig, Victoria
 Mirimbah, Victoria
 Monea South, Victoria
 Moorngag, Victoria
 Morockdong, Victoria
 Moyhu, Victoria
 Myrrhee, Victoria
 Nillahcootie, Victoria
 Oxley, Victoria
 Panbulla, Victoria
 Rothesay, Victoria
 Ruffy, Victoria
 Samaria, Victoria
 Strathbogie, Victoria
 Tallangallook, Victoria
 Tarcombe, Victoria
 Tatong, Victoria
 Toombullup, Victoria
 Toombullup North, Victoria
 Too-rour, Victoria
 Towamba, Victoria
 Wabonga, Victoria
 Wabonga South, Victoria
 Wallagoot, Victoria
 Wandiligong, Victoria
 Wappan, Victoria
 Whitfield, Victoria
 Whitfield South, Victoria
 Whorouly, Victoria
 Winteriga, Victoria
 Wondoomarook, Victoria
 Youpella, Victoria

References
Vicnames, place name details
Research aids, Victoria 1910

Counties of Victoria (Australia)